Gauguin is a crater on Mercury. It has a diameter of 70 kilometers. Its name was adopted by the International Astronomical Union (IAU) in 1979. Gauguin is named for the French painter Paul Gauguin, who lived from 1848 to 1903.

References

Impact craters on Mercury